Berkley is a fishing tackle company founded in Spirit Lake, Iowa in 1937 as Berkley Fly Co. by Berkley Bedell. 

Berkley is most known for its brands 'Berkley Trilene' fishing line and 'PowerBait' scented lures.

History
The Jarden Corporation acquired Berkley's parent company, Pure Fishing, in April 2007. 

The Jarden Corporation has since been acquired by the conglomerate company Newell Brands. Newell sold Pure Fishing to Sycamore Partners in 2018.

References

External links
 

Fishing equipment manufacturers
Manufacturing companies based in Iowa
American companies established in 1937
Manufacturing companies established in 1937
1937 establishments in Iowa
Dickinson County, Iowa
Newell Brands
2007 mergers and acquisitions
2016 mergers and acquisitions
2018 mergers and acquisitions